Dinar was a 10th-century Georgian princess of the Bagrationi dynasty of Tao-Klarjeti and Queen regnant of Hereti. She is venerated as a saint. The Georgian Orthodox Church commemorates her on June 30.

Life
Dinar was a daughter of hereditary ruler of Tao-Klarjeti, the eristavt-eristavi, "duke of dukes" Adarnase III of Tao by his unknown wife.

According to The Georgian Chronicles Queen Dinar, along with her son Ishkhani converted Hereti to the Eastern Orthodox confession and abandoned the Oriental Orthodox confession in the 10th century.

In Russia
Queen Dinar’s story is recounted in the Russian Chronicles more closely and The Tale of Tsaritsa Dinara may be about her. According to the Armenian historian Movses Kaghankatvatsi, Slavic tribes that carried out raids in the southern Caucasus would have heard the story of Queen Dinar, and this story made its way to Russia.

Today, on the north wall of the Throne Hall in the Moscow Kremlin, there's a fresco of Queen Dinar who's mounted on a white horse, victorious over the enemy.

See also
 The Tale of Tsaritsa Dinara

References

"ქართველ წმიდანთა ცხოვრებანი", თბილისი, 2004 წ.
Marie-Félicité Brosset, Additions et éclaircissements à l'Histoire de la Géorgie, Académie impériale des sciences, Saint-Pétersbourg, 1851, Addition IX, p. 155.
Cyrille Toumanoff, Les dynasties de la Caucasie chrétienne de l'Antiquité jusqu'au XIXe siècle : Tables généalogiques et chronologiques, Rome, 1990, p. 80 et 130.
Сперанский М. Н., «Повесть о Динаре в Русской Письменности», Известия Отделения Русского Языка и Словесности Академии Наук СССР», 1926, том XXXI, 53-54.
Ист.: Повесть о царице Динаре // Русские повести XV-XVI вв. / Сост.: М. О. Скрипиль. М.; Л., 1958. С. 88-91, 416-417
Вахушти Багратиони. История царства Грузинского / Пер., предисл., слов.
Н. Т. Накашидзе. Тбилиси, 1976; Матиане Картлиса / Пер., введ., примеч.: М. Д. Лордкипанидзе. Тбилиси, 1976.
Лебедев-Полянский. М.; Л., 1945. Т. 2. Ч. 1. С. 346-349; Зимин А. А. И. С. Пересветов и его современники: Очерки по истории рус. обществ.-полит. мысли сер. XVI в. М., 1958. С. 81-91, 106-108; История рус. лит-ры / Ред.
Д. С. Лихачев, Г. П. Макогоненко и др. Л., 1980. Т. 1. С. 263-264; ОИГ. 1988. Т. 2. С. 274-278; Жития груз. святых / Сост З. Мачитадзе и др. Тбилиси, 2002. С. 108

Year of birth unknown
Monarchs of Hereti
Bagrationi dynasty of Tao
10th-century rulers in Europe